The Road to Love, is a Colombian comedy telenovela produced by Juan Carlos Villamizar for Caracol Televisión. The series production began in February 2019, and is recorded in 4K Ultra-high-definition television. The production was presented at the 2019 LA Screenings, and is stars Katherine Escobar Farfán, Juan Manuel Restrepo, Mario Espitia, César Mora, Carmenza González, José Daniel Cristancho, Maria Laura Quintero, and Toto Vega.

The first season of the series became available for streaming on 4 December 2019 on Netflix.

Plot 
The Briceño are a nuclear family of truck drivers. Armando and Lucía are the aged parents, and Cecilia, Rigoberto (known as "Toronja"), Breiner and Darío are their adult children. Fabián, known as "Peluche", is an adoptive son. Armando wins a truck race with Cecilia as his co-pilot. In doing so Cecilia reveals that her brothers taught her to drive trucks, which Armando disapproves of. She runs away with the truck, unaware that the prize had been stored in it. Tulio gave pursuit, as the Briceño had a monetary debt and he intended to confiscate their truck. Tulio gets the truck and, unknown to the family, gets the prize money as well. The initial plots are about the attempts by the Briceño to get their truck back.

Cecilia discovered that she was pregnant. Armando banished her from the family home for getting pregnant out of wedlock. She leaves with Peluche to inform Samuel of his impending fatherhood, only to find that he was getting married. Samuel, however, finds out about this, causing conflicts with his wife and Cecilia. Rigoberto falls in love with Amalfi, the wife of rival trucker Octavio, and both start singing as a duet in secrecy. Breiner, an internet celebrity, tries to conceal his real life circumstance from a rich girl that likes him. Darío engages in several open relations, with Pilar falling in love with him anyway and getting jealous of the others. She gets pregnant and then hates him because he was with someone else when she had a miscarriage. Armando gets his hand damaged by age-related injuries, but ignores the doctor's orders to avoid driving.

Cast 
 Katherine Escobar Farfán as La Chiquis AK cecilia
 Juan Manuel Restrepo as Fabián Molano "Peluche"
 Mario Espitia as Samuel
 César Mora as Don Armando
 Carmenza González as Lucía
 José Daniel Cristancho as Toronja
 Mayra Luna Uribe as Ilse
 María Laura Quintero as Tatiana Gerlein
 Toto Vega as Don Tulio
 Camilo Amores as Breiner
 Linda Lucía Callejas as Doña Amalfi
 Melissa Bermúdez Soler as Majo
 Tania Fálquez as Neiva
 Santiago Rodríguez as Don Carlos
 Lorna Cepeda as Minerva

References 

Spanish-language Netflix original programming
2019 telenovelas
2019 Colombian television series debuts